Nuclear organization refers to the spatial distribution of chromatin within a cell nucleus. There are many different levels and scales of nuclear organisation. Chromatin is a higher order structure of DNA.

At the smallest scale, DNA is packaged into units called nucleosomes. The quantity and organisation of these nucleosomes can affect the accessibility of local chromatin. This has a knock-on effect on the expression of nearby genes, additionally determining whether or not they can be regulated by transcription factors.

At slightly larger scales, DNA looping can physically bring together DNA elements that would otherwise be separated by large distances. These interactions allow regulatory signals to cross over large genomic distances—for example, from enhancers to promoters.

In contrast, on a large scale, the arrangement of chromosomes can determine their properties. Chromosomes are organised into two compartments labelled A ("active") and B ("inactive"), each with distinct properties. Moreover, entire chromosomes segregate into distinct regions called chromosome territories.

Importance
Each human cell contains around two metres of DNA, which must be tightly folded to fit inside the cell nucleus. However, in order for the cell to function, proteins must be able to access the sequence information contained within the DNA, in spite of its tightly-packed nature. Hence, the cell has a number of mechanisms in place to control how DNA is organized.

Moreover, nuclear organization can play a role in establishing cell identity. Cells within an organism have near identical nucleic acid sequences, but often exhibit different phenotypes. One way in which this individuality occurs is through changes in genome architecture, which can alter the expression of different sets of genes. These alterations can have a downstream effect on cellular functions such as cell cycle facilitation, DNA replication, nuclear transport, and alteration of nuclear structure. Controlled changes in nuclear organization are essential for proper cellular function.

History and methodology
The organization of chromosomes into distinct regions within the nucleus was first proposed in 1885 by Carl Rabl. Later in 1909, with the help of the microscopy technology at the time, Theodor Boveri coined the termed chromosome territories after observing that chromosomes occupy individually distinct nuclear regions. Since then, mapping genome architecture has become a major topic of interest.

Over the last ten years, rapid methodological developments have greatly advanced understanding in this field. Large-scale DNA organization can be assessed with DNA imaging using fluorescent tags, such as DNA Fluorescence in situ hybridization (FISH), and specialized microscopes. Additionally, high-throughput sequencing technologies such as Chromosome Conformation Capture-based methods can measure how often DNA regions are in close proximity. At the same time, progress in genome-editing techniques (such as CRISPR/Cas9, ZFNs, and TALENs) have made it easier to test the organizational function of specific DNA regions and proteins. There is also growing interest in the rheological properties of the interchromosomal space, studied by the means of Fluorescence Correlation Spectroscopy and its variants.

Architectural proteins
Architectural proteins regulate chromatin structure by establishing physical interactions between DNA elements. These proteins tend to be highly conserved across a majority of eukaryotic species.

In mammals, key architectural proteins include:

 Histones: DNA is wrapped around histones to form nucleosomes, which are basic units of chromatin structure. Each nucleosome consists of 8 histone protein subunits, around which roughly 147 DNA base pairs are wrapped in 1.67 left-handed turns. Altogether, nucleosomes pack approximately 2 meters of double stranded DNA into a 10 µm diameter nucleus. The concentration and specific composition of histones used can determine local chromatin structure. For example, euchromatin is a form of chromatin with low nucleosome concentration - here, the DNA is exposed, promoting interactions with gene expression, replication, and organizational machinery. In contrast, heterochromatin has high nucleosome concentration and is associated with repression of gene expression and replication, as the necessary proteins cannot interact with the DNA.
 Chromatin remodeling enzymes: These enzymes are responsible for promoting euchromatin or heterochromatin formation by a number of processes, particularly modifying histone tails or physically moving the nucleosomes. This in turn, helps regulate gene expression, replication, and how the chromatin interacts with architectural factors. The list of chromatin remodeling enzymes is extensive and many have specific roles within the nucleus. For example, in 2016 Wiechens et al.  identified two human enzymes, SNF2H and SNF2L, that are active in regulating CTCF binding and therefore affect genome organization and transcription of many genes.
 CCCTC-binding factor (CTCF), or 11-zinc finger protein, is considered the most prominent player in linking genome organization with gene expression. CTCF interacts with specific DNA sequences and a variety of other architectural proteins, chiefly cohesin - these behaviours allow it to mediate DNA looping, thus acting as transcriptional repressor, activator, and insulator. Furthermore, CTCF is often found at self-interacting domain boundaries, and can anchor the chromatin to the nuclear lamina. CTCF is also involved in V(D)J recombination.
 Cohesin: The cohesin complex was initially discovered as a key player in mitosis, binding sister chromatids together to ensure proper segregation. However, cohesin has since been linked to many more functions within the cell. It has been found to help facilitate DNA repair and recombination, meiotic chromosome pairing and orientation, chromosome condensation, DNA replication, gene expression, and genome architecture. Cohesin is a heterodimer composed of the proteins SMC1 and SMC3 in combination with the SCC1 and SCC3 proteins. The entire complex is loaded onto DNA by the NIPBL-MAU2 complex in a ring-like fashion.

Levels of nuclear organisation

Linear DNA and chromosome basics

The first level of genome organization concerns how DNA is arranged linearly, and how it is packaged into chromosomes. DNA is composed of two antiparallel strands of nucleic acids, with two bound and opposing nucleic acids referred to as DNA base pairs. In order for DNA to pack inside the tiny cell nucleus, each strand is wrapped around histones, forming nucleosome structures. These nucleosome pack together to form chromosomes. Depending on the eukaryote, there are multiple independent chromosomes of varying sizes within each nucleus – for example, humans have 46 while giraffes have 30.

Within regions of the chromosome, the order of the DNA base pairs makes up specific elements for gene expression and DNA replication. Some of the more common elements include protein coding genes (containing exons and introns), noncoding DNA, enhancers, promoters, operators, origins of replication, telomeres, and centromeres. As of yet, there is not much evidence towards the importance of specific order of these elements along or between individual chromosomes. For example, the distance between an enhancer and a promoter, interacting elements that form a basis of gene expression, can range from a few hundred base pairs to hundreds of kb away. As well, individual enhancers can interact with a number of different promoters and the same is true for a single promoter interacting with multiple different enhancers.

However, on a larger scale, chromosomes are heterogeneous in the context of euchromatin and heterochromatin composition. As well, there is evidence of gene rich and poor regions and various domains associated with cell differentiation, active or repressed gene expression, DNA replication, and DNA recombination and repair. All of these help determine chromosome territories.

DNA looping

DNA looping is the first level of nuclear organization that involves chromosomal folding. In a DNA looping event, chromatin forms physical loops, bringing DNA regions into close contact. Thus, even regions that are far apart along the linear chromosome can be brought together in three-dimensional space. The process is facilitated by a number of factors including architectural proteins (primarily CTCF and Cohesin), transcription factors, co-activators, and ncRNAs. Importantly, DNA looping can be used to regulate gene expression – looping events can repress or activate genes, depending on the elements involved. Approximately 50% of human genes are believed to be involved in long range chromatin interactions through the process of DNA looping.

Looping was first observed by Walther Flemming in 1878 when he was studying amphibian oocytes. It was not until the late 20th century when DNA looping was correlated with gene expression. For example, in 1990, Mandal and colleagues showed the importance of DNA looping in repressing the galactose and lactose operons in E coli. In the presence of galactose or lactose, repressor proteins form protein-protein and protein-DNA interactions to loop the DNA. This in turn connects the gene promoters with upstream and downstream operators, effectively repressing gene expression by blocking transcription preinitiation complex (PIC) assembly at the promoter and therefore preventing transcription initiation.
	
In gene activation, DNA looping typically brings together distal gene promoters and enhancers. Enhancers can recruit a large complex of proteins, such as the mediator complex, PIC, and other cell specific transcription factors, involved in initiating the transcription of a gene.

Chromosomal domains

Self-interacting domains

Self-interacting (or self-associating) domains are found in many organisms – in bacteria, they are referred to as Chromosomal Interacting Domains (CIDs), whereas in mammalian cells, they are called Topologically Associating Domains (TADs). Self-interacting domains can range from the 1–2 Mb scale in larger organisms  to 10s of kb in single celled organisms. What characterizes a self-interacting domain is a set of common features. The first is that self-interacting domains have a higher ratio of chromosomal contacts within the domain than outside it. They are formed through the help of architectural proteins and contain within them many chromatin loops. This characteristic was discovered using Hi-C techniques. Second, self-interacting domains correlate with regulation of gene expression. There are specific domains that are associated with active transcription and other domains that repress transcription. What distinguishes whether a domain takes a particular form is dependent on which associated genes need to be active/inactive during particular phase of growth, cell cycle stage, or within a specific cell type. Cellular differentiation is determined by particular sets of genes being on or off, corresponding with the unique makeup of an individual cell's self-interacting domains. Lastly, the outside boundaries of these domains contain a higher frequency of architectural protein binding sites, regions and epigenetic marks correlated to active transcription, housekeeping genes, and Short interspersed nuclear elements (SINEs).

An example of a subset of self-interacting domains is active chromatin hubs (ACHs). These hubs were discovered during observation of activated alpha- and beta-globin loci. ACHs are formed through extensive DNA looping to form a "hub" of regulatory elements in order to coordinate the expression of a subset of genes.

Lamina-associating domains and nucleolar-associating domains
Lamina-associating domains (LADs) and nucleolar-associating domains (NADs) are regions of the chromosome that interact with the nuclear lamina and nucleolus, respectively.

Making up approximately 40% of the genome, LADs consist mostly of gene poor regions and span between 40kb to 30Mb in size. There are two known types of LADs: constitutive LADs (cLADs) and facultative LADs (fLADs). cLADs are A-T rich heterochromatin regions that remain on lamina and are seen across many types of cells and species. There is evidence that these regions are important to the structural formation of interphase chromosome. On the other hand, fLADs have varying lamina interactions and contain genes that are either activated or repressed between individual cells indicating cell-type specificity. The boundaries of LADs, like self-interacting domains, are enriched in transcriptional elements and architectural protein binding sites.

NADs, which constitutes 4% of the genome, share nearly all of the same physical characteristics as LADs. In fact, DNA analysis of these two types of domains have shown that many sequences overlap, indicating that certain regions may switch between lamina-binding and nucleolus-binding. NADs are associated with nucleolus function. The nucleolus is the largest sub-organelle within the nucleus and is the principal site for rRNA transcription. It also acts in signal recognition particle biosynthesis, protein sequestration, and viral replication. The nucleolus forms around rDNA genes from different chromosomes. However, only a subset of rDNA genes is transcribed at a time and do so by looping into the interior of the nucleolus. The rest of the genes lay on the periphery of the sub-nuclear organelle in silenced heterochromatin state.

A/B compartments
A/B compartments were first discovered in early Hi-C studies. Researchers noticed that the whole genome could be split into two spatial compartments, labelled "A" and "B", where regions in compartment A tend to interact preferentially with A compartment-associated regions than B compartment-associated ones. Similarly, regions in compartment B tend to associate with other B compartment-associated regions.

A/B compartment-associated regions are on the multi-Mb scale and correlate with either open and expression-active chromatin ("A" compartments) or closed and expression-inactive chromatin ("B" compartments). A compartments tend to be gene-rich, have high GC-content, contain histone markers for active transcription, and usually displace the interior of the nucleus. As well, they are typically made up of self-interacting domains and contain early replication origins. B compartments, on the other hand, tend to be gene-poor, compact, contain histone markers for gene silencing, and lie on the nuclear periphery. They consist mostly of LADs and contain late replication origins. In addition, higher resolution Hi-C coupled with machine learning methods has revealed that A/B compartments can be refined into subcompartments.

The fact that compartments self-interact is consistent with the idea that the nucleus localizes proteins and other factors such as long non-coding RNA (lncRNA) in regions suited for their individual roles. An example of this is the presence of multiple transcription factories throughout the nuclear interior. These factories are associated with elevated levels of transcription due to the high concentration of transcription factors (such as transcription protein machinery, active genes, regulatory elements, and nascent RNA). Around 95% of active genes are transcribed within transcription factories. Each factory can transcribe multiple genes – these genes need not have similar product functions, nor do they need to lie on the same chromosome. Finally, the co-localization of genes within transcription factories is known to depend on cell type.

Chromosome territories

The last level of organization concerns the distinct positioning of individual chromosomes within the nucleus. The region occupied by a chromosome is called a chromosome territory (CT). Among eukaryotes, CTs have several common properties. First, although chromosomal locations are not the same across cells within a population, there is some preference among individual chromosomes for particular regions. For example, large, gene-poor chromosomes are commonly located on the periphery near the nuclear lamina while smaller, gene-rich chromosomes group closer to the center of the nucleus. Second, individual chromosome preference is variable among different cell types. For example, the X-chromosome has shown to localize to the periphery more often in liver cells than in kidney cells. Another conserved property of chromosome territories is that homologous chromosomes tend to be far apart from one another during cell interphase. The final characteristic is that the position of individual chromosomes during each cell cycle stays relatively the same until the start of mitosis. The mechanisms and reasons behind chromosome territory characteristics is still unknown and further experimentation is needed.

References

External links 

 
Cell nucleus
Cellular processes